The 2003 Ms. Olympia contest is an IFBB professional bodybuilding competition and part of Joe Weider's Olympia Fitness & Performance Weekend 2003 was held on October 24, 2003, at the Mandalay Bay Arena in Paradise, Nevada. It was the 24th Ms. Olympia competition held. Other events at the exhibition include the Mr. Olympia, Fitness Olympia, and Figure Olympia contests.

Prize money

Weight-in
Heavyweights over :

Betty Pariso - 
Yaxeni Oriquen-Garcia - 
Betty Viana-Adkins - 
Helle Trevino - 
Iris Kyle - 
Vickie Gates - 
Lenda Murray - 

Lightweights up to :

Cathy LeFrançois - 
Kim Harris - 
Rosemary Jennings - 
Juliette Bergmann - 
Angela Debatin - 
Dayana Cadeau - 
Denise Masino - 
Fannie Barrios -

Results

Scorecard

Comparison to previous Olympia results:
Same - Lenda Murray
Same - Iris Kyle
+1 - Yaxeni Oriquen-Garcia
+3 - Betty Viana-Adkins
Same - Betty Pariso
-4 - Vickie Gates
Same - Juliette Bergmann
+3 - Dayana Cadeau
Same - Cathy LeFrançois
Same - Angela Debatin
-3 - Fannie Barrios
Same - Kim Harris

Attended
10th Ms. Olympia attended - Lenda Murray
8th Ms. Olympia attended - Vickie Gates
7th Ms. Olympia attended - Juliette Bergmann
6th Ms. Olympia attended - Yaxeni Oriquen-Garcia
5th Ms. Olympia attended - Iris Kyle
4th Ms. Olympia attended - Dayana Cadeau
3rd Ms. Olympia attended - Fannie Barrios and Angela Debatin
2nd Ms. Olympia attended - Kim Harris, Betty Pariso, Cathy LeFrançois, and Betty Viana-Adkins
1st Ms. Olympia attended - Rosemary Jennings, Denise Masino, and Helle Trevino
Previous year Olympia attendees who did not attend – Valentina Chepiga, Laura Creavalle, Sophie Duquette, Nancy Lewis, Susanne Niederhauser, and Beth Roberts

Notable events
 Lenda Murray wins her 8th overall and heavyweight Ms. Olympia title, thus having more Olympia tiles than any other female bodybuilder until 2012 when Iris Kyle tied with her overall title.  Juliette Bergmann wins her 3rd lightweight Ms. Olympia title.
 This was Vickie Gates's last Olympia before her retirement.

2003 Ms. Olympia Qualified

See also
 2003 Mr. Olympia

References

Ms Olympia, 2003
2003 in bodybuilding
Ms. Olympia
Ms. Olympia
History of female bodybuilding